Ram Naresh Pandey is an Indian politician and former member of the Bihar Legislative Assembly. He was the representative from the Harlakhi constituency from 2005–2010 as a member of the Communist Party of India. He is the state secretary of CPI Bihar state council and is a member of the National Executive of the Communist Party of India from Bihar.

References 

Communist Party of India politicians from Bihar
Year of birth missing (living people)
Living people